James A. Simpson is a retired minister of the Church of Scotland. He was Moderator of the General Assembly of the Church of Scotland in 1994-5 - the first from a Highland parish since James Gunn Matheson (from Portree Parish Church on the Isle of Skye) in 1975.

Background and career
In 1976 he moved from St. John's Renfield Church, Glasgow to Dornoch Cathedral in Dornoch, Sutherland. In 1997 he demitted his charge at Dornoch to become an "Interim Minister" for several years (helping congregations to working through periods of transition). His first post as an Interim Minister was Almondbank Tibbermore Church in Perthshire.  He is also known for his humorous books and regular column in the Church of Scotland's "Life and Work" magazine.

His title (following the end of his Moderatorial year) is the Very Reverend Dr James Alexander Simpson BSc BD STM DD. He is currently the oldest living former Moderator of the Church of Scotland, however Hugh Wyllie is the Moderator whose time in office was earliest.

See also
List of Moderators of the General Assembly of the Church of Scotland

References

Living people
20th-century Ministers of the Church of Scotland
Moderators of the General Assembly of the Church of Scotland
Year of birth missing (living people)